BNS Barkat is a Haizhui-class submarine chaser of Bangladesh Navy. She is serving Bangladesh Navy from 1996.

Career
BNS Barkat was commissioned in Bangladesh Navy on 9 April 1996. She is currently based at Chittagong.

Electronics
This radar is effective in performing mine laying operations also. For ASW operations, she uses a high frequency hull mounted active sonar.

Armament
The ship is armed with two Type 69 twin 14.5 mm heavy machine guns and two Type 76A twin 37 mm naval gun. This Type 76A gun can be used as CIWS also. For ASW operations, it uses a variety of weapons like one RBU-1200 Anti-submarine Rocket launchers and two anti-submarine mortars with 8 depth charges. Besides, this ship can lay up to 10 Naval mines.

See also
 List of active ships of the Bangladesh Navy

References

Ships of the Bangladesh Navy
Submarine chasers of Bangladesh Navy